The pyrazolopyridines are a group of drugs investigated as anxiolytics which act as positive allosteric modulators of the GABAA receptor via the barbiturate binding site. They include the following compounds:

 Cartazolate (SQ-65,396)
 Etazolate (SQ-20,009)
 ICI-190,622
 Tracazolate (ICI-136,753)

See also 
 Barbiturates
 Chlormethiazole
 Etomidate
 Loreclezole

References